The 2004 Monterey Sports Car Championships was the final race for the 2004 American Le Mans Series season and held at Mazda Raceway Laguna Seca.  It took place on October 16, 2004.

Official results

Class winners in bold.  Cars failing to complete 70% of winner's distance marked as Not Classified (NC).

Statistics
 Pole Position - #27 Creation Autosportif - 1:15.893
 Fastest Lap - #38 ADT Champion Racing - 1:17.134
 Distance - 
 Average Speed -

External links
 

M
Monterey Sports Car Championships